Copiocerinae is a subfamily of short-horned grasshoppers in the family Acrididae. There are at least 20 genera in Copiocerinae, found in southern North America, Central America, and South America.

Tribes and Genera
There are three tribes in Copiocerinae:

Aleuasini
Auth: Brunner von Wattenwyl, 1893
 Aleuas Stål, 1878 c g
 Zygoclistron Rehn, 1905 c g

Clematodini
Auth: Rehn & Eades, 1961
 Apoxitettix Descamps, 1984 c g
 Bucephalacris Giglio-Tos, 1894 c g
 Clematodes Scudder, 1900 i c g b
 Dellia Stål, 1878 c g

Copiocerini
Auth: Brunner von Wattenwyl, 1893

 Adimantus Stål, 1878 c g
 Antiphon Stål, 1878 c g
 Caenacris Amédégnato & Descamps, 1979 c g
 Chlorohippus Bruner, 1911 c g
 Contacris Amédégnato & Descamps, 1979 c g
 Copiocera Burmeister, 1838 c g
 Copiocerina Descamps, 1978 c g
 Copiotettix Descamps, 1984 c g
 Cyphacris Gerstaecker, 1889 c g
 Episcopotettix Rehn, 1903 c g
 Eumecacris Descamps & Amédégnato, 1972 c g
 Hippacris Scudder, 1875 c g
 Monachidium Serville, 1831 c g
 Oncolopha Stål, 1873 c g
 Opshomala Serville, 1831 c g
 Sinop Descamps, 1984

Data sources: i = ITIS, c = Catalogue of Life, g = GBIF, b = Bugguide.net

References

Further reading

 
 
 

Acrididae
Orthoptera subfamilies